American Dragons  (also known as Double Edge) is a 1998 action  crime thriller film directed by Ralph Hemecker and starring Michael Biehn, Park Joong-hoon, Cary-Hiroyuki Tagawa, Don Stark and Byron Mann. It was written by Erik Saltzgaber and Keith W. Strandberg and produced by Brad Krevoy.

Plot
Detective Tony Luca (Michael Biehn) is sent on a homicide investigation of a Yakuza leader after a bungled undercover sting to capture notorious gangster Rocco (Don Stark). After finding a folded origami lotus with the black lotus insignia Tony is assigned a partner, Detective Kim (Park Joong-hoon) from Seoul, South Korea. Kim is described by Luca's captain as an expert on the league of ninja assassins known as the Black Lotus Society. Both Yakuza and Mafia gangsters are being assassinated all over town by the mysterious assassin known to Kim as "Shadow" (Byron Mann).

After squeezing information out of Yakuza businessman Nakai (Hiro Kanagawa) and Mafia informant Mike (Brad Loree), the two detectives discover that the Black Lotus plans to ignite a mob war between the Yakuza and the Mafia and adopt their businesses. The two men responsible for the plan are Shadow and Rocco, two men who haunt the pasts of the two detectives. With the two detectives now cooperating with one another, they collect the leaders of both the Mafia and the Yakuza and inform them of the plan of the Black Lotus Society and take them both to the police holding station to prevent their deaths and prevent further mob killings.

With both mob leaders in safe keeping the two detectives hunt down the location of Shadow and Rocco. Fights ensue with Kim fighting Shadow, and Luca having a shootout with Rocco. It all comes down to an epic standoff, leaving Kim and Luca the only two left alive. Luca and Kim say their goodbyes at the airport wishing each other the best, leaving as friends. As Kim walks up the walkway to the plane a White Lotus Man is shown having his ticket taken by the gate. Taking his ticket stub back, this man reveals a lotus tattoo on the palm of his hand and leaves to take his flight, the same one Detective Kim is taking back to South Korea.

Cast
 Michael Biehn as Detective Tony Luca
 Park Joong-hoon as Detective Kim
 Cary-Hiroyuki Tagawa as Matsuyama
 Don Stark as Rocco
 Byron Mann as "Shadow"
 Benjamin Ratner as Angelo
 Lorena Gale as Captain Talman
 Hiro Kanagawa as Nakai
 Brad Loree as Mike
 Dean Choe as Sato
 Chris Franco as Pozzo
 James Crescenzo as Fiorino
 Roger Cross as Detective Dion Edwards (credited as Roger R. Cross)
 Kevan Ohtsji as Young Yakuza
 Warren Takeuchi as Aki
 Fulvio Cecere as Bobby Spano
 Rob Daprocida as Enzo
 Michael Hirano as Head Buddhist Monk
 Yuka Kobayashi as Asian Secretary
 Nadia Capone as Ginger
 LeRoy Schulz as Karaoke Detective (credited as Leroy Schulz)
 Jim Thorburn as Cop
 Lloyd Tinney as Bum
 Michael Sicoly as Father Rescinniti
 Jason Brown as Mobster
 Robert Lee as White Lotus Man
 Cordis Murillo as Ticket Agent
 Silvio Pollio as Italian Youth (credited as Sylvio Pollio)
 Roderick Falconer as Street Preacher
 Sonja Bakker as Screaming Woman
 Crystal Cass as Call Girl
 Sydney A. Belzberg as Auggie

External links

DVD Times Review

1998 films
1998 action thriller films
1998 crime thriller films
American action thriller films
American buddy films
American crime thriller films
Films scored by Joel Goldsmith
Films directed by Ralph Hemecker
Orion Pictures films
Metro-Goldwyn-Mayer films
Yakuza films
1990s English-language films
1990s American films
1990s Japanese films